Rufus P. Manson was a member of the Wisconsin State Assembly.

Biography 
Manson was born on February 15, 1830, in Eaton, New Hampshire. In 1854, he married Catherine Nicolls. They would have twelve children. Manson died on February 19, 1897.

Career 
Manson was a member of the Assembly from 1871 to 1872. Later, he served as Sheriff of Marathon County, Wisconsin, from 1875 to 1876 and from 1881 to 1882 and as Mayor of Wausau, Wisconsin, from 1885 to 1886. He had previously been clerk of two different courts. Manson was a Democrat.

References 

People from Carroll County, New Hampshire
Politicians from Wausau, Wisconsin
Wisconsin sheriffs
Democratic Party members of the Wisconsin State Assembly
Mayors of places in Wisconsin
1830 births
1897 deaths
19th-century American politicians